The singing starling (Aplonis cantoroides) is a medium-sized (20 cm in length) starling.

Description
Adult singing starlings have glossy black plumage and bright red irises. Immature birds are paler, with streaked underparts and brown irises. They are distinguished from metallic starlings by shorter, square tails and thicker bills.

Distribution and habitat
Singing starlings are found in New Guinea and some adjacent islands, the Bismarck Archipelago, Admiralty Islands and Solomon Islands. They have been recorded from Boigu and Saibai Islands, Queensland, Australian territory in north-western Torres Strait. They inhabit forest edges, gardens and cultivated areas with trees, urban areas and coconut groves.

Behaviour

Feeding
They eat figs and other soft fruits, and sometimes insects.

Breeding
They nest in tree-hollows, cliffs and buildings, often colonially, laying 2-3 pale blue eggs.

Call
The call is a repeated, high-pitched, down-slurred whistle.

Conservation
As a species with a large range and no evidence of population decline, it is assessed as being of Least Concern.

References

 Beehler, Bruce M.; & Finch, Brian W. (1985). Species Checklist of the Birds of New Guinea. RAOU Monograph No.1. Royal Australasian Ornithologists Union: Melbourne. 
 Beehler, Bruce M.; Pratt, Thane K.; & Zimmerman, Dale A. (1986). Birds of New Guinea. Wau Ecology Handbook No.9. Princeton University Press. 
 BirdLife International. (2006). Species factsheet: Aplonis cantoroides. Downloaded from http://www.birdlife.org on 4 Feb 2007
 Coates, Brian J. (1990). The Birds of Papua New Guinea. Vol.II: Passerines. Dove Publications: Alderly, Queensland. 
 Higgins, P.J.; Peter, J.M.; & Cowling, S.J. (eds). 2006. Handbook of Australian, New Zealand and Antarctic Birds.  Volume 7: Boatbill to Starlings. Oxford University Press: Melbourne.  

singing starling
Birds of Melanesia
singing starling
singing starling